Cuca Roseta is the first album released by fado singer Cuca Roseta. It was released in 2011 by Surco and Universal Music Portugal.

Track listing
 Porque Voltas De Que Lei	
 Homem Português	
 Quem És Tu Afinal	
 Nos Teus Braços	
 Lisboa A Namorar	
 Maré Viva	
 Tortura	
 Marcha De Santo António	
 Saudades Do Brasil Em Portugal	
 Rua Do Capelão	
 Avé-Maria Fadista

References

Cuca Roseta albums
2011 debut albums
Portuguese-language albums
Universal Music Group albums